Boatman is an unincorporated community in Mayes County, Oklahoma, United States. Boatman had a post office from August 28, 1922, to December 30, 1965. The community was named after merchant Joe P. Boatman.

References

Unincorporated communities in Mayes County, Oklahoma
Unincorporated communities in Oklahoma